St Catherine's School is an independent and non-denominational Christian day and boarding school for girls, located in Toorak, an inner south-eastern suburb of Melbourne, Victoria, Australia.

Established in 1896 as Castlemaine Ladies' College, the school has a non-selective enrolment policy. As for 2006 the school catered for approximately 730 students from pre-school to Year 12, including 80 boarders, on a 2.9 hectare campus. Boarding students come to St Catherine's from country Victoria, interstate and overseas.

St Catherine's is a member of the Junior School Heads Association of Australia (JSHAA), the Alliance of Girls' Schools Australasia, the Association of Independent Schools of Victoria (AISV), the Australian Boarding Schools Association, and a founding member of Girls Sport Victoria (GSV).

In August 2005, a scandal was brought upon the school when the then principal was found to be having unethical relations with students. It took over 2 years to find a replacement. In October 2007, Sylvia Walton AO was appointed as the twelfth principal of St Catherine's School.

History
St Catherine's School was founded as Castlemaine Ladies' College in 1896, by Jeanie Hood in Templeton Street, Castlemaine.

At the instigation of Henry Langley, the first Anglican Bishop of Bendigo, his daughters, Ruth, Aphra and Nona took over the school in 1903. The Langley sisters later changed the school's name to Castlemaine Girls' College, and in 1911 to St Catherine's Girls College, Castlemaine, after the Anglican school St Catherine's School at Waverley in Sydney, where Ruth and Nona Langley had been educated. St Catherine's was a nominally Anglican school at this time in its history.

In 1920, St Catherine's School moved to Williams Road in Melbourne, where 48 pupils were enrolled. Ruth Langley had been joined in 1919 by Flora Templeton, who came as co-principal from Blair School, at St Georges Road, Toorak, with her students.

In 1922, St Catherine's Grammar School had 80 students, and in need of more accommodation, Langley and Templeton purchased "Kilbride House", formerly known as "Beaulieu", at 17 Heyington Place, Toorak. The building was ultimately renamed "Sherren House" in recognition of Ruby Lawrence (née Sherren), who was the schools matron from 1923 to 1946. Flora Templeton died in 1931, but Ruth Langley continued the administration of the school, appointing Edna Holmes as headmistress. After Langley's death, at St Catherine's, on 17 December 1933, her sister, Hilda Langley, became principal.

In 1942, World War II saw the school buildings requisitioned as a residence for the Women's Auxiliary Australian Air Force (WAAAF). St Catherine's found a temporary home at Mountain Grand, Warburton, and returned to Heyington Place in 1943. In 1944, Sophie Borland was appointed headmistress and worked with Hilda Langley as principal until the end of 1947, when the trustee of the late Ruth Langley decided to hand control of the school to a council. The first chairman of the council was the Right Reverend John McKie, Bishop in Geelong.

In 1948, Barbreck, at 33 Heyington Place, was acquired for use as a junior school, making possible further extensions to the secondary school, and pupil numbers increased to about 400.

In 1950, Mary Davis was appointed as principal and headmistress. In 1957, Hilda Langley died, ending the Langley family's long association with the school. R. Ann Baylis served as principal from 1971 to 1977 and her two daughters attended the school. In 1977, Dorothy Pizzey was appointed to this post. In 1978, St Catherine's School inaugurated the senior student Slawa Duldig Art Prize.

Beginning in 2006, the school offered the IB Primary Years Programme

Campus
St Catherine's School is located on a single 2.9 hectare campus, in suburban Toorak, 6 km south-east of the Melbourne city centre. The school comprises the Early Learning Centre, the Junior School and the Senior School.

Sport 
St Catherine's is a member of Girls Sport Victoria (GSV).

GSV premierships 
St Catherine's has won the following GSV premierships.

 Cricket - 2011
 Hockey - 2001
 Tennis - 2013
 Volleyball - 2006

National Rowing Championships (Sydney Cup for Schoolgirl Eights) 

 2016
 2022

Henley Royal Regatta 
On Sunday 3 July 2022, the St Catherine's 1st VIII made history by winning the Prince Philip Challenge Trophy for Junior Women's Eights at Henley Royal Regatta, beating Winter Park Crew, USA in the final.

To progress to the final, St Catherine's beat St Paul's Girls' School and then Hinksey Sculling School in the heats and Surbiton High School in the semi-final.

The crew, known as "Maxi" (rowing in a boat christened "MMXXI" following the school's first Head of the Schoolgirls Championship in 2021) was undefeated in the 2021/2022 domestic rowing season.  They won the 2022 Head of the Schoolgirls Regatta and then the Schoolgirl Eight at the 2022 Australian Rowing Championships with a blistering second 1000m after trailing Melbourne Girls' Grammar by a length at the halfway mark.

The Crew

Cox: Summer Balla-Kellett, Stroke: Bronte Cullen, 7: Sienna Darcy, 6: Sarah Marriott, 5: Chloe Nevins, 4: Zara Bongiorno, 3: Lucy Green, 2: Jemima Wilcox, Bow: Zara Peele. Coaches: John Saunders and Brigette Carlile.

Music
St Catherine's offers a music program with an extensive classroom curriculum and instrumental program, a range of opportunities for both individual and ensemble performance are available.

Classroom music
Classroom music forms a part of the core curriculum from the Early Learning Centre through to Year 8. Girls of all ages are encouraged to learn an instrument and to join the choirs, ensembles, orchestras and bands which rehearse and perform regularly.

In Years 7 and 8, students develop music appreciation, performance skills and explore a wide variety of music technology programs available through our keyboard laboratory.

From Year 9 onwards, music becomes an elective and VCE subject with emphases on developing performance, composition and analysis skills.

Instrumental program
All students have the opportunity to learn a stringed instrument in Year 2, recorder in Year 3 and 4, and a brass or woodwind instrument in Year 5. These small group lessons allow students a "hands-on" experience including opportunities to perform throughout the year.

The school also offers a comprehensive Instrumental Program in all instrument families (including string, woodwind, brass, voice, percussion and keyboard instruments) where students learn with specialist teachers in classical and contemporary styles. Individual tuition from specialist staff is available for violin, viola, cello, double bass, flute, clarinet, oboe, bassoon, alto saxophone, tenor saxophone, horn, trumpet, trombone, tuba, piano, harpsichord, recorder, classical singing, jazz singing, guitar, harp, percussion, music theory.

Choirs and ensembles
The ensemble program provides ensemble opportunities from classical to contemporary. The list of ensembles includes choirs, orchestras, concert bands, string, woodwind, brass and percussion ensembles, chamber groups and contemporary groups.

The Epstein Singers,
àBeckett Strings,
Junior Concert Band,
Suzuki ‘Cellos,
Suzuki Violins,
Flute group, 
Percussion and recorderensemble, 
Chamber ensembles,
The Langley Singers   – Prep to Year 2,
Heyington Choir – Years 3 and 4 Choir,
Barbreck Choir – Years 5 and 6 Choir,

Jorgensen Orchestra,
Senior School Concert Band,
Soul Power,
Sherren Singers,
Chamber flutes,
Years 7–12 choir,
Viva Voci,
Stage band,
Brass ensemble,
Percussion ensemble,
Years 7 and 8 concert band,
Years 7 and 8 flute ensemble,
and small chamber ensembles

An extensive performance program enables all students to participate in a wide variety of concerts and recitals including the annual gala concert, twilight concert, instrumental recitals, Barbreck Concert, Barbreck recitals, masterclasses, jazz cabaret evenings and music theatre performances. Students also perform at the school's church services, speech nights, assemblies and many other school events both at school and in the community.

Notable alumnae
Alumnae of St Catherine's School are known as "Old Girls" and may elect to join the schools' alumni association, the St Catherine's Old Girls' Association Inc. Some notable St Catherine's Old Girls' include:

Academic 
Margaret Loch Kiddle – historian (also attended Melbourne Girls Grammar School)
Alison Patrick (née Hamer) – historian and first female Head of History at Melbourne University
Sue Richardson – Professor of Labour Economics and Director of the National Institute of Labour Studies at Flinders University; Commissioner, Essential Services Commission of South Australia; Author (also attended Preshil)

Business 
Natalie Bloom – Owner and founder of Bloom (Cosmetics); Victorian Young Australian of the Year 1997
Margaret Florence Darling AM (née Anderson) – Company Director; Grazier; Former Patron of the Australian Garden Historical Society; Former Vice-President of the National Trust of Australia (Vic.); Attained rank of Third Officer in the Women's Royal Australian Naval Service
Sandra Forbes – Arts and Publishing Consultant; Editor of the 'TAASA Review'; Former Executive Officer of the Literature Program Australia Council; Former Member of the Australian National Commission for UNESCO
Merran Kelsall – Chairman, Auditing and Assurance Standards Board, Public Transport Industry Ombudsman (Victoria) and Professional Indemnity Insurance Company Australia Pty Limited; Director, Melbourne Water Corporation and Cuscal Ltd; Trustee of the National Gallery of Victoria
Felicity Jane Singleton AM – Managing Director of Jane Singleton Public Affairs Pty Ltd; CEO of the Australian Reproductive Health Alliance

Community and philanthropy 
Lady Anna Cowen – Former President of the World Education Fellowship (Queensland); Wife of former Governor-General, Sir Zelman Cowen (also attended Shelford Girls' Grammar)
Dame Elisabeth Murdoch AC DBE – Philanthropist, widow of Australian newspaper publisher Sir Keith Murdoch and mother of international media proprietor Rupert Murdoch
Jill Reichstein – Chair of the Reichstein Foundation; Helped establish the first women's refuge in Victoria; Developed community childcare for the City of Brunswick; Co-ordinated Victorian Cooperative of Children's Services for Ethnic Groups; Past President and a Board Member of Philanthropy Australia
Lady Marigold Merlyn Baillieu Southey AC – Lieutenant Governor of Victoria; President of the St Catherine's School Foundation; Director of the Myer Foundation; Former Director of the Myer Family Company; Recipient of the Centenary Medal 2003; Daughter of Sidney Baevski Myer and Dame Margery Merlyn Baillieu Myer
Pamela Myer Warrender – Author; Honorary Life Member, Committee for Melbourne; Founder and former Director of the Committee for Melbourne; Former Chairman of the Museum of Modern Art and Design Australia; Daughter of Sir Norman Myer

Entertainment, media and the arts 
Barbara Brash – Modernist painter and printmaker 
Celia Ann Burrell AM – Author, Illustrator, Photographer; Director of El Questro Publishing
Ann Rachel Church – Set and costume designer
Anne Elder – Ballet dancer and Poet; Namesake of the Anne Elder Award (Prefect and Dux 1936)
Diane Holuigue – [OAM] Teacher, Chef, Author, Food editor for the Weekend Australian, and Australian Magazine
Sunday Reed – Supporter and collector of Australian art and culture; Wife of art editor, John Reed
Rosemary Ryan – artist, art director
Elyne Mitchell  (née Chauvel) – Author of the acclaimed 'Silver Brumby' series and other works.
Lisa Gorton – Poet and author. 
Elizabeth Wallfisch – classical violinist

Medicine and science 
Joanne Wainer – Social scientist and Senior Lecturer at Monash University School of Rural Health; Helped establish Australia's first publicly acknowledged abortion clinic; Awarded Human Rights award by Amnesty International (Victoria) for work for women's reproductive rights 1999

Politics, public service and the law 
Her Hon. Judge Jane Campton – Judge of the County Court of Victoria
Mary (Mollie) Clark - first female librarian at Parliament of Victoria (along with Flora Brennan)
Linda Dessau AM – Judge of the Family Court of Australia, AFL Commissioner, Governor of Victoria
Lady April Hamer (née Mackintosh) – Wife of Sir Rupert Hamer, Premier of Victoria
Sophie Mirabella (née Panopoulos) – Liberal MP and Monarchist (also attended Albert Park High School)
Her Hon. Judge Anna Robertson (née Lally) - Judge of the County Court of Victoria
Wendy Wilmoth – County Court judge and former deputy coroner

Royalty 
Princess Sharifah Junetta – Daughter of the Paramount Ruler of Malaysia, the Yang di-Pertuan Agong

Sport 
Lauren Hewitt – Olympic and Commonwealth Games track athlete
Joan Richmond – motor racing driver
Anna Segal – Olympic skier

Notable faculty
Slawa Horowitz Duldig (1901–1975) - artist, inventor, interior designer, and teacher; held in internment camp for two years as an enemy alien

See also
 List of schools in Victoria
List of boarding schools
 Victorian Certificate of Education

References

External links
St Catherine's School website

Boarding schools in Victoria (Australia)
Educational institutions established in 1896
Girls' schools in Victoria (Australia)
Nondenominational Christian schools in Melbourne
International Baccalaureate schools in Australia
1896 establishments in Australia
Alliance of Girls' Schools Australasia
Buildings and structures in the City of Stonnington